Jim Ryan (born July 10, 1975) is an American former college football coach. He served as the head football coach at Rhodes College in Memphis, Tennessee from 2016 to 2019 compiling a record of 16–24. Ryan coached at Washington University in St. Louis from 2008 to 2015, the last four in which he was the defensive coordinator, and at Illinois College from 2003 to 2007. In 2015, Ryan was named the AFCA Division III Assistant Coach of the Year. He was interim head coach at Colorado College in 2003 where he also served as defensive coordinator during the 2002 season. He was an assistant coach at the University of North Alabama, Delta State University, and Fort Lewis College.

Head coaching record

References

External links
 Rhodes profile

1975 births
Living people
Colorado College Tigers football coaches
Delta State Statesmen football coaches
Fort Lewis Skyhawks football coaches
Illinois College Blueboys football coaches
North Alabama Lions football coaches
Rhodes Lynx football coaches
Washington University Bears football coaches
Colorado State University Pueblo alumni
University of Central Missouri alumni